Crossing the Line is a 2002 television movie written by Susanna Styron and Bridget Terry and directed by Graeme Clifford.  It is a sports comedy drama exploring what happens when parents go too far in pushing their children.

Synopsis
A former All-American basketball player lands a job as assistant coach for a three-time championship girls' high school basketball team. After the head coach has a heart attack, she takes over and clashes with several parents who push their daughters to win at all costs.

Terry Farrell ...  Laura Mosbach
Adrian Pasdar ...  Eric Harrison
Sumela Kay ...  Carly Harrison
Sherry Miller ...  Jennifer Blackstone
Barry Flatman ...  Jerry Blackstone
Lawrence Dane ...  Coach Tom Holliday
Josh Buckle ...  Zack Mosbach
Amy Rutherford ...  Danielle Blackstone
Courtney Hawkrigg ...  Sheryl Baines
Courtenay Betts ...  Amy Fulton
Serena Lee ...  Marcy Houston
Jamie Robinson ...  Reggie Williams
Taylor Abrahamse ...  Robert Blackstone
Bill Lake ...  Joe Fulton
Phillip Jarrett ...  Coach Davidson
Michael Falloon ...  Streetsville Referee
Beverly Cooper ...  Pam Baines (as Beverley Cooper)
Ron Gabriel ...  Eric's Lawyer
Mishu Vellani ...  Prosecutor
David Clement ...  Judge
Tony Meyler ...  School Board Member
Ola Sturik ...  TV Sportscaster
Kathryn Long ...  Tiger Captain

External links

2002 television films
2002 films
American television films
American basketball films
Films directed by Graeme Clifford
2000s American films